The discography of DJ Shadow, an American music producer and disc jockey, consists of six studio albums, six live albums, six compilation albums, two remix albums, two mix albums, five extended plays, twenty-eight singles and fourteen music videos. He released his debut single – a split release featuring his track "Lesson 4" and "Real Deal" by American hip hop ensemble Lifers Group – in 1991. After signing to Mo' Wax Records in 1993, he released the singles "In/Flux" and "Lost and Found (S.F.L.)", both of which became minor hits in the United Kingdom. Shadow attained his first top 75 single the following year with "What Does Your Soul Look Like", which peaked at number 59 in the UK. In November 1996, his debut studio album Endtroducing..... was released to critical acclaim. It peaked at numbers 17 and 75 in the UK and the Netherlands respectively, later being certified gold by the British Phonographic Industry (BPI). The album's first single, "Midnight in a Perfect World", charted at number 54 in the UK. "Stem", the album's second single, became a top fifteen hit in Ireland. Remix singles of the Endtroducing..... tracks "What Does Your Soul Look Like (Part 1 – Blue Sky Revisit)" and "The Number Song" were also issued. The compilation album Preemptive Strike peaked at number 118 on the United States Billboard 200, becoming Shadow's first album to chart in the country. It produced one single, "High Noon", which peaked at number 22 in the UK.

Shadow's second studio album The Private Press was released in June 2002, peaking at number 44 on the Billboard 200. It also charted in several other countries, peaking at number eight in the UK and earning a gold certification from the BPI. The album's first two singles – "You Can't Go Home Again" and "Six Days" – became top ten hits on the Billboard Hot Singles Sales and Hot Dance Singles Sales charts. In 2005, Shadow collaborated with English alternative rock band Keane on the single "We Might as Well Be Strangers", which peaked at number 123 in the UK and number 27 on the Hot Singles Sales chart. He released his third studio album The Outsider in September 2006; it peaked at number 77 on the Billboard 200. The album produced four singles, including the UK top 60 hit "This Time (I'm Gonna Try It My Way)".

The Less You Know, the Better, Shadow's fourth studio album, was released in September 2011 and peaked at number 149 on the Billboard 200. It also became his third consecutive top five album on the Billboard Dance/Electronic Albums chart, where it peaked at number five. "Scale It Back", the album's third single, charted in the Belgian region of Flanders.

Albums

Studio albums

Live albums

Compilation albums

Remix albums

Mix albums

Extended plays

Singles

Other appearances

Guest appearances

Remix work

Music videos

References

External links
 Official website
 DJ Shadow at AllMusic
 
 

Discography
Discographies of American artists
Electronic music discographies